Robert Sibley (1881–1958) was an American professor.

Robert Sibley may also refer to:

 Robert Pelton Sibley (1879–1957), American academic and headmaster
 Robert Sibley (basketball) (born 1966), Australian basketball player